TV Avisen is a Danish television newscast broadcast by DR1.

History 
TV Avisen was broadcast for the first time on 15 October 1965 - up until this point, television had already been broadcast regularly in Denmark for 14 years. This was due to an agreement signed between DR and the press in 1926 which guaranteed the press' control of the broadcast of news on television and radio. The agreement remained in place after the introduction of television and was rescinded on 1 July 1964.

Initially, TV Avisen mostly consisted of footage from foreign news agencies with a musical accompaniment in the style of a newsreel. The programme began broadcasting in colour in October 1978. Five years later, the television news operation moved from its small studios at Radiohuset in Rosenørns Allé to TV-Byen in Gladsaxe.

In 1988, DR lost its monopoly in Danish television news when second government broadcaster TV2 (founded in 1988) began broadcasting its own news service. In an effort to compete, the main 7.30pm programme was replaced in 1993 by two evening bulletins at 6pm and 8.30pm. The following year, the programmes were moved half an hour later to 6.30pm and 9pm.

In 2006, the morning edition of TV Avisen was axed due to low viewing figures. In the same year, DR's television, radio and online operations were combined in the new DR Byen complex in Copenhagen. TV Avisen received a new design and began broadcasting in 16:9 widescreen. In 2012, the late evening programme was moved to 9.30pm on Monday - Thursday nights. On June 13 2017, TV Avisen was rebranded with updated titles and a new studio design.

Current Broadcasting Times 
 Daily at 07:00, (weekend 08:00) 12:00, 18:30.
 Daily (except Saturday) at 21:00

Features of the Programme 
TV Avisen always begins with a short summary of the news. The top story tends to concern a Danish issue. TV Avisen has its own permanent correspondents in Washington DC, New York City, Rome, Brussels, China and the Middle East, as well as a special climate correspondent.

As is usual for Danish television, reports which contain foreign languages (for example interviews with foreign politicians or foreign press conferences) are not dubbed in Danish, but subtitled.

Online Streaming 
All TV Avisen programmes from the previous 30 days are available from the DR website. Livestreaming is only possible when using an IP address from Denmark.

External links 
 
 

Danish television news shows
DR TV original programming
Danish-language television shows